The FIM Enduro World Championship, formerly known as the World Enduro Championship, is the world championship series for enduro, a popular form of off-road motorcycle sport. The championship currently features three classes (E1, E2 and E3), along with separate categories for junior and female riders. The championship was first organized in 1990, and currently consists of 16 races based on eight two-day events. All rounds include an enduro test, a motocross test and an extreme test.

History
 
The World Enduro Championship began in 1990, replacing the FIM European Enduro Championship, which had been contested since 1968. The European championship was later restarted by the Union Européenne de Motocyclisme (UEM) in 1993. The WEC had six classes from 1990 to 1993, after which the 80 cc and 500 cc 2-stroke championships were discontinued. The series continued with four classes, 125, 250, 350 and 500 cc, until the 1998 season, which saw 250 cc 4-stroke as a new class and the 350 cc replaced by 400 cc. In 1998, all rounds also counted towards an overall championship, which was continued until 2004.

The competition classes of the WEC were revised for the 2004 season. The number of classes was reduced to three, and 2-stroke and 4-stroke machines were now competing in the same classes. The new classes were named Enduro 1, Enduro 2 and Enduro 3. The 2005 season saw a new addition; the Enduro Junior class (EJ). The age limit in the junior class was originally 21 years, but was later changed to 23. A class for female riders, Enduro Women, was started in 2010.

The points system of the WEC originally awarded points for 15 best riders in each class, starting with 20 for the winner, 17 for second place and 15 for third. Since the 2004 season, the twenty fastest riders have received points, with 25 going to the winner of each class, 22 for the second fastest and 20 for the third-placed rider.

The 2007 championship included six events in Europe, one in the United States and one in Canada. In the 2008 season, all eights rounds were held in Europe. The current main broadcaster of the championship is Eurosport 2. In South America and Oceania, the series is broadcast on ESPN and Fox Sports, respectively.

Current classes
Enduro 1 (E1) – Up to 250cc 2 stroke and 4 stroke.
Enduro 2 (E2) – 255+ cc up to 450cc 4 stroke.
Enduro 3 (E3) – 255+ cc 2 stroke and 450+ cc 4 stroke.
Enduro GP  – Rankings based on overall standings (E1-E2-E3).

Champions

Overall championship

Junior championship

Women championship

Youth Cup

See also
 International Six Days Enduro, the team championship of enduro
 FIM SuperEnduro World Championship

References

External links

Motorcycle off-road racing series
World motorcycle racing series
Fédération Internationale de Motocyclisme